Ziad (also transliterated as Ziyad, Zyad, Zeyad, or Zijad ) is an Arabic given name and surname.

Given name

Actors
 Zeyad Errafae'ie, Syrian television actor and voice actor

Athletes
 Zeyad Abdulrazak, Kuwaiti hurdler
 Zeyad Mater, Yemeni judoka
 Zyad Chaabo, Syrian footballer
 Ziad Jaziri, Tunisian football striker
 Ziad Richa, Lebanese skeet shooter 
 Ziad Tlemçani, Tunisian footballer
 Ziad Al-Muwallad, Saudi Arabian football defender
 Ziad Agha, Palestinian rugby and rugby league player
 Ziyad Tariq Aziz Brisam, Iraqi football defender
 Ziyad Al-Kord, Palestinian footballer
 Ziyad Al-Sahafi, Saudi Arabian footballer 
 Zyad Jusić, Dutch football striker

Businessmen
 Ziad Takieddine Lebanese-French businessman, alleged arms broker
 Ziad Makkawi, Lebanese American investor
 Ziyad Cattan, Iraqi Polish businessman, alleged arms dealer
Ziad Abdelnour (financier), Lebanese-born American investment banker and financier

Film directors
 Ziad Antar, Lebanese filmmaker and photographer
 Ziad Doueiri, Lebanese film director
 Ziad Hamzeh, American film director
 Ziad Touma, Lebanese Canadian film director

Writers
 Ziad Majed, Lebanese political researcher
 Ziyad Marar, Iraqi writer and publisher

Musicians
 Ziad Rahbani, Lebanese composer, pianist, playwright, and political commentator

Poets
 Ziyād al-Aʿd̲j̲am,  poet of the Umayyad period of Persian origin

Politicians
 Ziad Aboultaif, Canadian politician
 Ziad Abs, Lebanese politician
 Ziad Abu Amr Palestinian politician, author, and member of the Palestinian Legislative Council
 Ziad Abu Ein, Palestinian politician
 Ziad Bahaa-Eldin, Egyptian politician
Ziyad Baroud, Lebanese civil servant and civil society activist
 Ziad Durrani, Pakistani politician
 Ziad Makhzoumi, Lebanese British businessman and public speaker
 Ziyad Sabbagh (born 1960), Syrian politician

Military
 Ziyad ibn Abi Sufyan, Muslim general
 Ziyad ibn Abih (622–673 AD), Muslim general and administrator
 Ziad Fahd, Free Syrian Army brigadier general
 Ziad al-Hariri, Syrian senior officer and defence minister
 Zijad Subašić, Bosniak military leader in Višegrad during the early stage of the Bosnian War (1992–95)

Other
 Ziad Abuzayyad, Palestinian lawyer, journalist
 Ziad Rafiq Beydoun, petroleum geologist and professor
 Ziad Fazah, Lebanese polyglot
 Ziad el-Doulatli, Tunisian activist
 Ziad al-Khasawneh, Jordanian lawyer who headed a team of twenty-two defence lawyers for former Iraqi President Saddam Hussein.
 Ziad Jarrah, Lebanese hijacker pilot involved in the hijacking of United Airlines Flight 93
 Ziyad Khaleel, also known as Khalil Ziyad, Ziyad Sadaqa, and Ziyad Abdulrahman, was a Palestinian-American al-Qaeda member
 Zijad Delić, Bosnian Canadian imam, activist, teacher, scholar and public speaker

Surname
 Howar Ziad, Iraqi politician and ambassador
 Hussein Ziad, Jordanian footballer
 Tawfiq Ziad (1929–1994), Palestinian politician well known for his "poetry of protest".

See also
 Tarik-ibn-Zeyad, more commonly Tariq ibn Ziyad, a Muslim commander who led the Islamic Umayyad conquest of Visigothic Hispania in the 8th century
Ziyadid dynasty, a Muslim dynasty that ruled western Yemen from 819 until 1018 from the capital city of Zabid
Zayed (disambiguation)
Zaid, an Arabic masculine name

Arabic masculine given names
Arabic-language surnames